The sculptor squirrel or Bornean pygmy squirrel (Glyphotes simus) is a species of rodent in the family Sciuridae. It was described by Michael Rogers Oldfield Thomas in 1898. It is monotypic within the genus Glyphotes.

The chest, undersurface, sides of the nose, margins of the ears and dorsal surface of the digits are yellow, whereas the tip of the tail is black.

References

Further reading
Thorington, R. W. Jr. and R. S. Hoffman. 2005. Family Sciuridae. pp. 754–818 (782) in Mammal Species of the World a Taxonomic and Geographic Reference. D. E. Wilson and D. M. Reeder eds. Johns Hopkins University Press, Baltimore.

Mammals described in 1898
Endemic fauna of Malaysia
Rodents of Malaysia
Callosciurinae
Taxa named by Oldfield Thomas
Taxonomy articles created by Polbot